Sara Walsh is an American politician serving as a member of the Missouri House of Representatives from the 50th district.

Early life and education 
Walsh was born in Torrance, California, and moved to Ashland, Missouri, in 1986. She earned a Bachelor of Business Administration from Columbia College and a Master of Public Affairs from the Truman School of Public Affairs of the University of Missouri.

Personal life
In 2012, Walsh married Steve Walsh, a former journalist who became press secretary to Congresswoman Vicky Hartzler.

During the COVID-19 pandemic in Missouri, the Walshs both decided not to receive the COVID-19 vaccine. Sara Walsh did not receive the vaccine on the basis that vaccines were not fully approved by the Food and Drug Administration and due to side effects experienced by some of her friends. Both of the Walshs contracted COVID-19 in early August 2021; Steve Walsh was admitted to a hospital for recovery while Sara Walsh recovered at home. On August 19, Steve Walsh died of the virus, aged 63.

Career 
In 2005, Walsh worked as a legislative assistant in the Missouri House of Representatives. From 2004 to 2014, she was a programs and outreach manager for the National Newspaper Association. In 2014 and 2015, she was a staff auditor in the office of the state auditor of Missouri. From 2015 to 2017, she was a member services coordinator for the Missouri Pharmacy Association.

Missouri House of Representatives 
Walsh was elected to the House in April 2017 to replace Caleb Jones, who resigned to take on the job as deputy chief of staff to Missouri Governor Eric Greitens. She is a member of the Republican Party. Since 2021, she has served as the Republican majority caucus chair.

Walsh also serves as chair of the House Consent and Procedure Committee.

Walsh is anti-abortion, and supported a proposal that would remove Medicaid funding from Planned Parenthood in Missouri.

2022 congressional election 
On July 7, 2021, Walsh announced her candidacy for Missouri's 4th congressional district in the 2022 election.

References

Republican Party members of the Missouri House of Representatives
Women state legislators in Missouri
Year of birth missing (living people)
Living people
People from Torrance, California
Columbia College (Missouri) alumni
University of Missouri alumni
21st-century American women